The 2022 Iowa Secretary of State election was held on November 8, 2022, to elect the Secretary of State of Iowa.  Incumbent Republican Paul Pate ran for re-election, defeating democratic opponent Joel Miller.

Republican primary

Candidates

Declared
Paul Pate, incumbent secretary of state

Results

Democratic primary

Candidates

Nominee
Joel Miller, Linn County auditor

Eliminated in primary
Eric Van Lancker, Clinton County auditor

Endorsements

Results

General election

Predictions

Results

References

External links
Official campaign websites
Joel Miller (D) for Secretary of State
Paul Pate (R) for Secretary of State

Secretary of State
Iowa
Iowa Secretary of State elections